El Refugio ("The Refuge") is a census-designated place (CDP) in Starr County, Texas, United States. The population was 331 at the 2010 census. El Refugio gained area in the 2010 census.

Geography
El Refugio is located at  (26.342149, -98.759408).

According to the United States Census Bureau, the CDP has a total area of 0.6 square miles (2.0 km), all land.

Demographics
At the 2000 census there were 221 people, 56 households, and 50 families living in the CDP. The population density was 434.5 people per square mile (167.3/km). There were 67 housing units at an average density of 131.7/sq mi (50.7/km).  The racial makeup of the CDP was 100.00% Caucasian. Hispanic or Latino of any race were 99.10%.

Of the 56 households 50.0% had children under the age of 18 living with them, 71.4% were married couples living together, 17.9% had a female householder with no husband present, and 10.7% were non-families. 10.7% of households were one person and 7.1% were one person aged 65 or older. The average household size was 3.95 and the average family size was 4.30.

The age distribution was 30.8% under the age of 18, 18.1% from 18 to 24, 27.1% from 25 to 44, 15.4% from 45 to 64, and 8.6% 65 or older. The median age was 26 years. For every 100 females, there were 114.6 males. For every 100 females age 18 and over, there were 104.0 males.

The median household income was $12,750 and the median family income  was $12,176. Males had a median income of $31,528 versus $30,625 for females. The per capita income for the CDP was $6,344. About 40.0% of families and 51.2% of the population were below the poverty line, including 74.0% of those under the age of eighteen and none of those sixty five or over.

Education
The community is served by the Rio Grande City Grulla Independent School District (formerly Rio Grande City Consolidated Independent School District)

References

Census-designated places in Starr County, Texas
Census-designated places in Texas